Buttedahl is a Norwegian surname. Notable people with this surname include:

 Johan Buttedahl (born 1935), Norwegian dentist and politician
 Knute Buttedahl (1925–2000), Canadian academic
 Paz Buttedahl (1942–2007), Canadian academic
 Sæbjørn Buttedahl (1876–1960), Norwegian actor and sculptor